Pole Position is a board game published in 1989 by Piatnik.

Contents
Pole Position is a game in which each player has three cars which use cards for movement, and play is on a single lane track.

Reception
Brian Walker reviewed Pole Position for Games International magazine, and gave it 4 stars out of 5, and stated that "As the track differs each time the replay value of the game is high. There is considerable scope for strategy and for frustrating the plans of others. All in all, a fine game."

Pole Position was nominated for the 1988 Spiel des Jahres.

References

Board games introduced in 1989